California Western Railroad No. 45 is an operating  logging "Mikado" type steam locomotive, located at the California Western Railroad, a.k.a. the world-famous Skunk Train, in Fort Bragg, California.  The locomotive was built in 1924, by the Baldwin Locomotive Works for the Owen-Oregon Lumber Company, (Brownlee-Olds Lumber Co., later the Medford Corporation) where it hauled lumber until its retirement in 1964.  The Medford Corporation sold No. 45 to the California Western Railroad in 1965.  The Mendocino Railway, a subsidiary of Sierra Northern, purchased the railroad in 2003 after the California Western filed for bankruptcy.

Between 1965 and 1980, No. 45, along with stablemate No. 46, (a  Mallet), pulled the railroad's Fort Bragg - Willits summer steam excursion train, the "Super Skunk". The California Western discontinued steam service in 1981.  In 1984, No. 46 was donated to the Pacific Southwest Railway Museum, as a result of high maintenance costs, and the opinion that the locomotive was too light on its feet.  (No. 46 was a saddle-tank locomotive, before California Western added a tender and removed the aforementioned tank.)

In 1983, after two-year operational hiatus, the locomotive briefly returned to service, and was renumbered No. 44 for a role in Racing with the Moon.  The locomotive retained this number for several months.

In 2001, the locomotive was removed from service for an overhaul.  The locomotive returned to service in May 2004, and currently operates regular "Skunk Train" service to Northspur Wednesday through Saturday, May through October. No. 45 began to show its age, and, as a result, the Sierra Railroad discontinued the Super Skunk service to Willits. No. 45 occasionally travels to Willits for special events, although a diesel helper is required for additional power and dynamic braking. In fact, there are currently no trains that traverse the entire route; passengers must transfer at Northspur.

References

Baldwin locomotives
2-8-2 locomotives
Preserved steam locomotives of California
Transportation in Mendocino County, California
Individual locomotives of the United States
Standard gauge locomotives of the United States